A-League Men (known as the Isuzu UTE A-League for sponsorship reasons) is the highest-level professional men's soccer league in Australia and New Zealand. At the top of the Australian league system, it is the country's premier men's competition for the sport. A-League Men was established in 2004 as the A-League by the Football Federation Australia (FFA) as a successor to the National Soccer League (NSL) and competition commenced in August 2005. The league is currently administered by the Australian Professional Leagues (APL), contested by twelve teams; eleven based in Australia and one based in New Zealand. The men's, women's and youth leagues have now been brought together under a unified A-Leagues banner.

Seasons run from October to May and include a 26-round regular season followed by a Finals Series playoff involving the six highest-placed teams, culminating in a grand final match. The winner of the regular season tournament is dubbed the 'Premier' while the winner of the grand final is the season's 'Champion'. This differs from the other major football codes in Australia, where 'premier' refers to the winner of the grand final and the winner of the regular season is the 'minor premier'.

Successful A-League Men clubs gain qualification into the Asian continental club competitions, the AFC Champions League (ACL) and the AFC Cup. In 2014, the Western Sydney Wanderers became the first and only winning Australian club. Similar to the United States and Canada's Major League Soccer, as well as other professional sports leagues in Australia, A-League Men does not practice relegation and promotion.

History

Origins
A national round-robin tournament existed in various forms prior to the formation of the A-League, with the most notable being the National Soccer League (NSL). The formation of the NSL came after Australia's qualification for the 1974 FIFA World Cup, which led to discussion of a national league, with 14 teams eventually chosen to participate in the inaugural season of the NSL in 1977.

Under the guidance of the then-governing body, the Australian Soccer Federation (later Soccer Australia), the NSL flourished through the 1980s and early 1990s but then fell into decline with the increasing departure of Australian players to overseas leagues, a disastrous television deal with the Seven Network and the resulting lack of sponsorship. Few clubs continued to grow with Sydney Olympic, Perth Glory, and the newly established Adelaide United the exception in a dying league.

In April 2003, the Australian Federal Government initiated the Independent Soccer Review Committee to investigate the governance and management of the sport in Australia, including that of the NSL. In December 2003, the Crawford Report found that the NSL was financially unviable, and in response the chairman of the sports new governing body, Frank Lowy of the Football Federation Australia, announced that a task force would be formed to create a new national competition as a successor to the NSL which dissolved at the conclusion of the 2003–04 season after 27 years of operation.

Foundations
The A-League was announced in April 2004, as a successor to the NSL. Eight teams would be part of the new national competition, with one team from each city of Sydney, Melbourne, Brisbane, Adelaide, Perth, Newcastle, plus a New Zealand team and one from a remaining expressions of interest from either Melbourne or Sydney. The competition start date was set for August 2005.

By June of that year, 20 submissions had been received and a month later 12 consortiums sent in their final bids for the eight spots. Three bids were received from Melbourne, two each from Sydney and Brisbane, one from each of the remaining preferred cities and a bid from the New South Wales Central Coast city of Gosford. Over the next three months, each bid was reviewed and on 1 November 2004, the eight successful bidders and the major sponsor were revealed, for what would be known as the Hyundai A-League, with the Hyundai Motor Company unveiled as the official naming rights sponsor for the league.

The eight founding teams for the league were Adelaide United, the Central Coast Mariners, the Melbourne Victory, the Newcastle Jets, the New Zealand Knights, the Perth Glory, the Queensland Roar, and Sydney FC, with four former NSL clubs taking part, those being Adelaide United, the Newcastle Jets, and the Perth Glory, as well as the Queensland Lions who withdrew their first team from the Queensland State League and entered it in to the competition as the Queensland Roar plus the New Zealand Knights who were formed from the New Zealand Football Kingz. Each club was given a five-year exclusivity deal in its own market as part of the league's "one-city, one-team" policy. This was intended to allow clubs to grow and develop an identity in their respective region without local competition.

Initial seasons
On 26 August 2005, 16 months after the demise of the NSL, the inaugural season of the A-League began. The first season would see Adelaide United win the premier's plate by seven points over Sydney FC with Central Coast and Newcastle filling the final two spots in the final series. In the final series, it was Sydney that took out the title after they defeated Central Coast by a Steve Corica goal to claim the first title on 5 March 2006. The following season saw Melbourne Victory claim the A-League premiers plate when they smashed Adelaide United 6–0 in the final at the Telstra Dome with Archie Thompson scoring five goals in the rout. But the season wasn't without a change with the New Zealand Knights being replaced by the Wellington Phoenix after the Knights were taken over by New Zealand Football after the team only won six times in forty-two games and selected overseas talent instead of local.

Development and reforms

Both Gold Coast United and the North Queensland Fury joined the league in the 2009–10 season. On 12 June 2009, Melbourne Heart was awarded a licence to join the 2010–11 season. On 1 March 2011 North Queensland Fury's A-League licence was revoked for financial reasons. On 29 February 2012, Gold Coast United also had its licence revoked. On 4 April 2012, it was announced that a new Western Sydney-based club, Western Sydney Wanderers, would join the league for the 2012–13 season. In January 2014, Melbourne Heart was acquired by the City Football Group and was renamed Melbourne City ahead of the 2014–15 season. In February 2018, officials announced that the league would expand to 12 teams for the 2019–20 season. Later that year, the league announced that Western United FC would join the competition in 2019–20 and Macarthur would enter the following season (2020–21).

In the lead-up to the expansion announcements in 2019, club stakeholders entered into discussions with Football Federation Australia (FFA) to take over ownership of the competition. The league had been created and operated by the FFA since its inception in 2004, though by 2018 the FFA and clubs were at loggerheads over the permanent ownership structure of the league. A FIFA-backed congress review working group issued a sweeping 100-page report in August 2018, recommending an expanded domestic congress and an independent A-League, controlled and operated by the clubs. On 1 July 2019, the FFA and Australian Professional Football Clubs Association (the body representing the A-League clubs) announced an agreement had been reached for the FFA to relinquish control of the league to the clubs by the following month, in time for the start of the 2019–20 season. The agreement brought the sport in line with the governance structure utilised in most European leagues. The new ownership body is called the Australian Professional Leagues, a consortium of the A-League clubs and their owners, with certain rights held by the FFA, and a capital investment & ownership stake held by American firm Silver Lake.

In 2020, soccer experts concluded A-League is entering a new crisis era, due to lack of major competitiveness and that total reforms must be done to improve the league, including the introduction of promotion and relegation system, and this has started to be debated. In response, A-League officials in May 2021 announced that the league will align to the Domestic Match Calendar to avoid clashing with FIFA Days, as well as introducing Domestic Transfer System and National Club Licensing frameworks.

Competition format

Regular season
The regular season runs mainly during the Australian summer, from early October to April of the following year. The competition consists of 26 rounds, with each team playing every other team two or three times. The teams allotted two home matches against an opponent in one season are allotted one home match against that opponent in the following season. Each match sees the winning team awarded three competition points, with one point each for a draw. The club at the top of this ladder is crowned A-League Premiers, and since the 2005–06 season has been entered into the AFC Champions League. The Premier is presented with a trophy known as the Premier's Plate.

At the completion of the regular season the top six placed teams on the league table progress to the finals series. The position of each team is determined by the highest number of points accumulated during the regular season. If two or more teams are level on points, the following criteria are applied in order until one of the teams can be determined as the higher ranked:

 Highest goal difference;
 Highest number of goals scored;
 Highest number of points accumulated in matches between the teams concerned;
 Highest goal difference in matches between the teams concerned;
 Highest number of goals scored in matches between the teams concerned;
 Lowest number of red cards accumulated;
 Lowest number of yellow cards accumulated;
 Toss of a coin.

Finals series

The top six clubs at the conclusion of the regular season progress to the finals series. The finals series culminates to the A-League grand final, where the winner is crowned A-League champion and receives a place in the AFC Champions League. The club that wins the grand final is presented with the A-League Champions Trophy.

The finals series consists of six teams who are placed by rank, as determined at the end of the regular season. The finals series runs over four weeks. In the first week of fixtures, the third-through-sixth ranked teams play a single-elimination match, with the two winners of those matches joining the first and second ranked teams in two-legged ties played over two weeks. The two winners of those matches meet in the grand final. This method was initially adopted for the 2021–22 season.

Up until 2022, between the two grand finalists, the team that finished higher on the ladder at the conclusion of the regular season hosted the grand final. The only exception to this was if the FA deemed that team's home ground to be an inappropriate venue. For example, in 2008, Central Coast Mariners (as the higher-placed team) hosted the grand final against the Newcastle Jets at Sydney Football Stadium, due to FFA deciding that Central Coast Mariners' home stadium, Central Coast Stadium with a capacity of 20,000, was too small for the event. On 12 December 2022, the Australian Professional Leagues announced that the grand finals for the 2022–23, 2023–2024 and 2024–25 seasons would be hosted in Sydney, a move which received considerable backlash.

Grand final host stadium

Continental qualification

In 2004–05, Australia was still a part of the Oceania Football Confederation and Sydney FC won the right to compete in the Oceania Club Championship after defeating the Central Coast Mariners in a qualifying tournament.

A-League clubs are eligible for participation in the AFC Champions League competition each season since the 2007 edition of the tournament. Wellington Phoenix are not eligible to compete in the Asian Champions League, nor do they compete in the OFC Champions League. The only Australian side to win the Asian Champions League are the Western Sydney Wanderers FC.

Qualification is determined by league finishing positions and the winner of the Australia Cup Final, with the number of positions determined by the Asian Football Confederation club competition ranking.

Other competitions
Since 2014 clubs compete in the annual Australia Cup knock-out tournament (previously known as the FFA Cup). Since 2021, the top eight teams qualify for the competition's Round of 32, while the bottom four teams play-off against each other for the final two slots.

Between 2005 and 2008 clubs participated in the A-League Pre-Season Challenge Cup prior to each A-League regular season. In 2013 and 2014 an A-League All Stars Game was also played as a pre-season friendly game between the league's finest players and a high-profile international team.

Most A-League Men clubs have teams in the A-League Youth competition, which runs in conjunction with the A-League Men as a national youth developmental and reserve league. All players in the youth teams are between the ages of 16 and 21 as of the start of the calendar year for each new season, while four over-age players from each of the senior teams also allowed to be selected. In addition, the A-League Women operates as the top division of women's league with affiliations to the men's competition.

In response to the debate about the development of a new professional second division, the Australian Championship has been proposed to support the A-League, with the aim to avoid the American franchise-based system and to put in line with European football leagues.

Clubs

The A-League Men is currently contested by 12 teams: eleven from Australia and one from New Zealand. A total of 15 teams have competed at some stage in the league's short history. Only four of these clubs – Adelaide United, the Brisbane Roar (as the Queensland Lions), the Newcastle Jets, and the Perth Glory – existed before the A-League was formed in 2004. Gold Coast United, the New Zealand Knights, and the North Queensland Fury have formerly competed in the league.

Unlike most leagues from across the world, there is no system for relegation and promotion of teams. The A-Leagues system thus shares some franchising elements with most other professional leagues in Australia, Major League Soccer, and other major Northern American-based sports leagues.

Timeline

Expansion 

While making a relatively modest start to ensure future stability, both the FFA and the soccer media indicated significant interest in expanding the league. The eight foundation clubs had exclusivity clauses for their respective cities valid for five years, but this did not exclude teams from other areas joining the league.

Before the introduction of the A-League, FFA chairman Frank Lowy speculated that he hoped to expand the league into other cities, mentioning Canberra, Hobart, Wollongong, Geelong, Bendigo, Cairns, Ballarat, Albury–Wodonga, Launceston, Christchurch, Auckland, Sunshine Coast and possibly Darwin and later Singapore.

In February 2018, officials announced that the league would expand to 12 teams for the 2019–20 season. In December 2018, the FFA announced they accepted the bids of Western United who joined the league in the 2019–20 season and of Macarthur FC, who joined the league in the 2020–21 season.

In 2021, further steps were taken in an attempt to expand from the recent 12 clubs, with goals being set to get 14 clubs in 2022–23 and a potential 16 clubs in 2023–24.

In March 2023, the Australian Professional Leagues confirmed plans for the next two expansion clubs to be based in Canberra and Auckland, ahead of the 2024–25 season.

Rivalries 
There are several key rivalries and local derbies that have formed in the A-League, including:

"Melbourne Derby" – Melbourne City v Melbourne Victory
The two Melbourne clubs first met on 8 October 2010 in a lively game at AAMI Park in front of 25,897 fans. Melbourne City (known at the time as Melbourne Heart) came out on top with a 2–1 victory. A significant narrative in derby history is the role of Melbourne Victory as a more successful club both on and off the field, having joined the A-League five years earlier than City. The rivalry is one of the most intense and well respected in the A-League, producing noticeable atmosphere and some of the largest attendances in the league.

"The Original Rivalry" – Adelaide United v Melbourne Victory 
The rivalry stems from the traditional cross-border rivalry between sporting teams from South Australia and Victoria but was strengthened by multiple incidents in the 2006–07 season, such as the confrontation between Melbourne Victory captain Kevin Muscat and Adelaide United coach John Kosmina. The two clubs contested the 2007 and 2009 A-League Grand Finals, with Melbourne winning the 2009 Grand Final 1–0 against a 10-man Adelaide United side. The two clubs were also involved in the first and only occasion in the A-League during the 2008–09 A-League season, where they both finished on the top of the ladder equal on both points and goal difference.

"Sydney Derby" – Sydney FC v Western Sydney Wanderers
The derby was contested for the first time in the 2012–13 season with the introduction of the second Sydney-based club, Western Sydney Wanderers, into the league. Sydney FC grabbed bragging rights by winning the first derby 1–0 at Parramatta Stadium, however Western Sydney Wanderers won the return match at Allianz Stadium 2–0. A Sydney Derby held early in the 2015 season broke the Allianz Stadium record for attendance during a regular season in any football code, dating back to the stadium's opening in 1988. A match in 2016 between the two teams broke the record A-League crowd with 61,880 fans attending the match at ANZ Stadium. Sydney Derby is intensified by the geographic distinction between the two clubs within Sydney, as well as historical grievances related to the foundation of Sydney FC.

"The Big Blue" – Melbourne Victory v Sydney FC
This match is so named because blue is the main colour of both teams' playing kits, and is also Australian slang for a fight or a contest. The rivalry has emerged as a result of a number of spiteful encounters between the teams in recent years, and due to the longstanding rivalry between Sydney and Melbourne, Australia's two largest cities. The teams have competed against each other in three grand finals; in 2010 & 2017, with Sydney winning 4–2 on penalties after a 1–1 draw on both occasions and in 2015, with Victory winning 3–0. In 2010, Sydney FC won the A-League Premiership on the final day of the season by defeating Victory 2–0. A Big Blue match is traditionally played on Australia Day each year.

"The F3 Derby" – Central Coast Mariners v Newcastle Jets
Named after the former name of the freeway that connects the cities of Newcastle and Gosford, this match features the only two clubs in the A-League that are not based in state or national capital cities. The two teams' stadiums are just one hour apart, and the derby was intensified when they competed against each other for the premiership in the 2007–08 A-League season and eventually met in the Grand Final, which was won 1–0 by the Jets.

"The Westgate Derby / The Battle of the Bridge" – Melbourne Victory v Western United  Upon joining the A-League in the 2019–20 season as the 3rd club in Victoria, Western United has developed a rivalry with Melbourne Victory. Despite the rivalry's short existence, it has garnered a reputation for producing talking points, controversy, tension, goals and drama. In the team's first meeting, in November 2019 at Marvel Stadium, Western United won 3–2 despite going 2–0 down within the first 7 minutes. In February 2021 at Marvel Stadium, despite conceding the first goal of the match and despite being reduced to 10 men for the final half-hour of the match, Western United won 4–3, with Victor Sanchez scoring in the final minute of stoppage time. After keeping the Victory winless for the first 5 matches of the rivalry (4 wins, 1 draw), Melbourne Victory ended their losing run in emphatic fashion on 28 May 2021, beating Western United 6–1 at AAMI Park.

"The Distance Derby" – Perth Glory v Wellington Phoenix

First contested in Wellington with their introduction to the A-League in 2007–08, this fixture is considered one of the longest away trips in world football for a domestic top-flight competition, with the distance between the two cities (which themselves are in different countries) being 5,225km. Since 2015–16, the two teams have contested the "Long Distance Derby Cup", which is awarded to the team with the best results from the three regular season fixtures between them.

Organisation

Logo and trophies

The current A-League logo was unveiled in January 2017 by Football Federation Australia. The logo formed part of a wider rebranding branding of the A-League and its subsidiary competitions, the W-League and Youth League. The logo design was "inspired by football's three outstanding features – atmosphere, diversity and unity" and has colour alterations tailored to each of the 12 A-League clubs. The changes came into effect before the 2017/18 season. The original A-League logo was designed by Coast Design Sydney. It was the inaugural logo of the league. The two-toned ochre colours represented the sun, earth and desert while the 'glow' emanating from the centre of the logo depicted the playing season's spring and summer time span. The eight 'A' figures that made up the ball shape represented the eight foundation clubs of the league. A-league decided to rebrand with a new logo in 2021 designed by R/GA, a creative agency in Sydney, leading to a major controversy and narrowly avoided legal trouble with building company in Adelaide over design similarities.

The A-League has two trophies which are competed for during the season: the Premier's Plate and the A-League Trophy. The Premier's Plate is awarded to the A-League Premiers, the regular season winners, and the A-League Trophy is awarded to the A-League Champions, the winner of the Grand Final. Both pieces of silverware were designed by Sydney design company D3 Design. The A-League Trophy is nicknamed the "Toilet Seat" due to its shape. Where as the Premier's Plate follows a traditional trophy design, the A-League Trophy differs. In 2005, John O'Neill, FFA CEO commented during the unveiling of the A-League Trophy, "We have a new national league and we feel it is important to re-define the conventional view of a trophy to reflect this". Clive Solari of D3 Design explained the trophy's design, saying "We wanted our trophy concept to embody the historical significance of sport in a contemporary design. So we looked to history to see how great achievements have been rewarded across all types of games for thousands of years. The winners of the world's original sporting competition, the Olympic Games, were presented with a laurel wreath on their heads. We used this model as a basis for a unique, cutting-edge design – our trophy is a modern and versatile translation of the wreath. The winners can hold it above their heads as a symbol of success".

Squad formation and salary cap

The A-League match-day squad includes the typical 11 players, and five substitutes of which one must be a goalkeeper. Prior to the 2013–14 season, just four substitutes including one goalkeeper were allowed to be named in the starting line-ups for the teams.

An A-League squad must comprise a minimum of 20 players with a maximum of 26, subject to several limitations. Within the squad, there can be a maximum of five "foreign" or "Visa" players, from outside Australia (and New Zealand, in the case of Wellington Phoenix), that hold a temporary working-visa. Three players in the squad must also be under 20 years of age. In addition to these three under 20 players, clubs are allowed to sign an additional three youth players onto full-time contracts at a lower pay rate than the rest of the squad. The A-League had initially proposed that the quota of five visa players per A-League club be reduced to four in the 2015–16 season, with the limit of four possibly become "3+1", which means three imports from anywhere and one from Asia (following regulations in the AFC Champions League). However, after opposition to the proposal by both players and managers, the move was placed on hold.

Although A-League clubs have restricted salaries (salary cap), the league allows each club to have two "marquee" players whose salaries are exempt from the cap, plus a number of other 'exemptions' or 'allowances' to incentivise clubs to spend in specific areas. Guest players are also excluded for up to a maximum of 14 league matches. From the formation of the league, clubs have been allowed to sign one international marquee player. From the 2008–09 season, A-League clubs have been permitted a junior marquee player; one that is under the age of 23. Now known as the 'Homegrown Player allowance', clubs can spend up to a collective $150,000 on three Australian players aged 23 or younger that have come through the club's youth system. On 19 April 2010, the A-League announced that, in addition to the international marquee and junior marquee, clubs would be allowed an Australian marquee player from the 2010–11 season. Notable marquee and guest players in the A-League have included Alessandro Del Piero, William Gallas, Dwight Yorke, Keisuke Honda, Damien Duff, Emile Heskey, Robbie Fowler, Shinji Ono, David Villa and former FIFA World Player of the Year Romário. Famous Australian Marquees include Harry Kewell, John Aloisi, Brett Emerton, Joshua Kennedy and Tim Cahill. From the 2021–22 A-League Men season, the league added a designated player slot, whose salary is exempt from the cap, but must be $300,000–$600,000 per season. The following season, the league added a second designated player slot for each club.

Commencing in the 2015–16 season, players who have played at their club for 5–10 years will be covered by a "loyalty player allowance", allowing up to $200,000 of their salary to be exempted from the cap. Additionally, clubs are now permitted a mature-age rookie whose wages are outside the salary cap.

The 2016–17 season saw the introduction of a third 'Full Season Guest Marquee' spot, designed to attract high-profile players on short-term deals.

The salary cap for A-League clubs is $2.1 million for the 2020–21 season. In the case for Western United and debuting Macarthur FC, they are entitled to a $333,000 allowance thus increasing their salary cap to $2.433 million. Clubs must spend at least the salary floor which is $1.7 million. The salary cap applies to the 18 to 23 players that clubs have registered to their A-League player roster, the top 2 highest-paid players (Designated Players) don't count in the cap. Unless specifically exempt, all payments and benefits (e.g. cars, accommodation, etc.) provided by a club to a player are included in the club's salary cap. Players registered at a club for more than 4 consecutive years as a professional are considered as Loyalty Players and have the following amounts exempt from a club's salary cap; Year 4 – 12.5%, Year 5 – 25%, and 5% increments after that up until a max of 50%. Teams can spend an unlimited amount on 4 U-23 Australian players who have come from the youth team, called Homegrown Players. Teams can sign up to 9 U-20 players on minimum wage called Scholarship Players who don't count in the squad unless they are one of the 3 U21's in the squad, any payments above the national minimum wage to these Players are included in the club's Salary Cap.

Stadiums

A-League games have been played in 33 stadiums since the inaugural season of the A-League in 2005. Dolphin Stadium, the home of Brisbane Roar, is currently the smallest used in the A-League, with a capacity of 11,500.

Sponsorship
Since its formation, the A-League has been sponsored by an official naming rights partner. In 2004, the Hyundai Motor Company was announced as the sponsor for the first three seasons of the league, known for commercial purposes as the "Hyundai A-League". In 2008, Hyundai renewed its initial contract with FFA for another four seasons until 2012, and that contract was further extended by four seasons until 2016. This sponsorship deal was then further extended to the end of the 2019–20 A-League season.

On 23 December 2020, it was announced that the new major sponsor of the A-League and W-League would be home improvement store Bunnings Warehouse.

On October 6, 2021, Isuzu UTE was announced as the naming rights partner of the A-League Men in a 3-year deal, with the league known as the Isuzu UTE A-League Men.
 Hyundai: 2005/06–2019/20
 Bunnings Warehouse: 2020/21
 Isuzu UTE: 2021/22–present

League championships

As of the 2021–22 season, 14 different clubs have competed in the league, with eight having won the trophy, and eight winning at least one premier's plate. 5 clubs have won a Premiership-Championship double, a feat achieved 10 times.

Records

Brisbane Roar hold the record for the longest unbeaten run in the competition with 36 league matches without defeat.

Besart Berisha holds the record for the greatest number of A-League goals, with 142 goals, playing for Brisbane Roar, Melbourne Victory and Western United. The A-League record for most goals in a single match is held by Archie Thompson, scoring 5 goals against Adelaide United on 18 February 2007, during the 2007 A-League Grand Final; and Jamie Maclaren who scored 5 goals against Melbourne Victory on 17 April 2021.

Jamie Maclaren has scored the most A-League hat-tricks with 6.

Shane Smeltz and Bobô are the only players to have scored hat-tricks in consecutive matches.

Henrique was the first, and so far only, player to score a hat-trick coming on as a substitute, for Brisbane Roar against Newcastle Jets.

In 2015, Austrian striker Marc Janko broke the record for scoring in consecutive matches when he scored in seven games for Sydney FC.

Media coverage

In Australia

From the start of the 2005–06 season to the 2012–13 season, television coverage of the A-League in Australia had been restricted to the subscription-only Fox Sports channel, to which only 7% of Australian residents had access.

On 19 November 2012, free-to-air Australian public broadcasting television network SBS secured the shared rights, alongside long-time A-League broadcasters Fox Sports, to the A-League from the 2013–14 season with a A$160 million four-year broadcast deal.

SBS's coverage ended in the 2016–17 season, with Network Ten securing free-to-air broadcast rights. Ten simulcasted the Fox Sports coverage of the Saturday night fixture on its digital multichannel One.

From the 2019–20 season, ABC TV has broadcast one game a weekend (Saturday 5pm) live on its primary channel. It also has the right to broadcast delayed coverage of some finals matches and the Grand Final. Fox Sport's contract with the A-League, which was renegotiated in June 2020 amidst the COVID-19 pandemic, concluded in July 2021.

Since August 2021, as part of a five-year deal with ViacomCBS, the A-Leagues are being broadcast by Network 10 and Paramount+ streaming service. Initially one A-League Men match per weekend was broadcast on Ten's main channel and all matches were streamed on Paramount. As of the 2022–23 season, Paramount streams all matches and two matches per weekend are broadcast on 10 Bold.

Other countries
In New Zealand the league has been broadcast on Sky Sport since its inaugural season. In the 2019–20 season, the league also broadcast on Qatari beIN Sports after Sky ink four-year partnership for extensive soccer coverage, especially the A-league.

The growth of coverage of the A-League outside Australia saw the league broadcast in 65 countries around the world in 2013/14. Full match broadcasts are available in the United States, China, Italy, England, Ireland, Scotland, Wales, Canada, the Caribbean, Hong Kong, Singapore and Myanmar. In addition to the full match broadcasts, highlights of A-League matches can be viewed in 53 countries throughout Asia and the Middle East, including Japan and South Korea. In 2014, a three-season deal with Sony TEN allowed the league to be broadcast live in Asian nations including Afghanistan, Bangladesh, Bhutan, India, Maldives, Nepal, Pakistan and Sri Lanka. Every A-League match is also live streamed globally, allowing games to be viewed online through a subscription service provided in a partnership with the FFA. All games were also broadcast live in the United States on ESPN+ until 2021. Most games in the United Kingdom are broadcast by BT Sport but use Paramount+ live feed for every live game. For the 2014–15 Season, the A-League was broadcast in 173 countries.

Promotion
The A-League has been promoted using a number of different advertising slogans and strategies since its inception. At the start of the inaugural season, a 3 million dollar advertising campaign was launched, with the television and film advertisements produced by Ridley Scott's production company Scott Free Productions. The theme for the campaign was: "Football, but not as you know it". A new television advertisement was created for the start of the 2007–08 season, which debuted on Foxtel's program Total Football. It was filmed at Bob Jane Stadium in Melbourne. Other campaigns include the "90 minutes, 90 emotions", which was used for two seasons from 2007 to 2009 and was accompanied by the music track "My People" from Australian act The Presets.

Current broadcasters

Broadcasters as of the 2022–23 season are as follows:

Logos

See also

 Australian soccer league system
 A-League Women
 A-League Youth
 E-League
 List of A-League head coaches

Notes

References

External links

 

 
2004 establishments in Australia
Football Australia
Multi-national professional sports leagues
Professional sports leagues in Australia
Silver Lake (investment firm) companies
1
Sports leagues established in 2004
Summer association football leagues
Australia